The Paul M. Hebert Law Center, often styled "LSU Law", is a public law school in Baton Rouge, Louisiana. It is part of the Louisiana State University System and located on the main campus of Louisiana State University.

Because Louisiana is a civil law state, unlike its 49 common law sister states, the curriculum includes both civil law and common law courses, requiring 94 hours for graduation; the most in the United States. In the Fall of 2002, the LSU Law Center became the sole United States law school, and only one of two law schools in the Western Hemisphere, offering a course of study leading to the simultaneous conferring of a J.D. (Juris Doctor), which is the normal first degree in American law schools, and a D.C.L. (Diploma in Comparative Law), which recognizes the training its students receive in both the common and the civil law.

Until voting in April 2015 to realign itself as an academic unit of Louisiana State University, the Paul M. Hebert Law Center was an autonomous school. Its designation as a Law Center, rather than Law School, derives not only from its formerly independent campus status but also from the centralization on its campus of J.D. and post-J.D. programs, foreign and graduate programs, including European programs at the Jean Moulin University Lyon 3 School of Law, France, and the University of Louvain, Belgium, and the direction of the Louisiana Law Institute and the Louisiana Judicial College, among other initiatives.

According to the school's 2017 ABA-required disclosures, 81.3% of the Class of 2017 obtained full-time, long-term, bar passage-required employment nine months after graduation, excluding solo practitioners.

History
In 1904, LSU constitutional law professor Arthur T. Prescott, who earlier had been the founding president of Louisiana Tech University, became the first to propose the establishment of a law school at LSU.

The law school came to fruition in 1906, under LSU president Thomas Duckett Boyd, with nineteen founding students. Since 1924, the LSU Law Center has been a member of the Association of American Law Schools and approved by the American Bar Association. The Law Center was renamed  in honor of Dean Paul M. Hebert  (1907–1977), the longest serving Dean of the LSU Law School, who served in that role with brief interruptions from 1937 until his death in 1977. One of these interruptions occurred in 1947-1948, when he was appointed as a judge for the United States Military Tribunals in Nuremberg.

Demographics
In 2011, the Law Center received 1,437 applications for the J.D./C.L. program for an enrolled class of 239. The current first-year class includes graduates from 80 colleges and universities throughout the nation. Women make up 49% of the class, 51% are men. Approximately 35% of the class of 2014 came from outside Louisiana representing 19 others states, United States Virgin Islands, France, and China.

LSU Journal of Energy Law and Resources 
The Center publishes the biannual open-access LSU Journal of Energy Law and Resources that focuses on the law of energy development, energy industries, natural resources, and sustainable development.

Employment 
According to the Law Center's official 2018 ABA-required disclosures, 89% of the Class of 2018 obtained full-time, long-term, bar passage-required employment 10 months after graduation, excluding solo-practitioners. The school's Law School Transparency under-employment score is 11.6%, indicating the percentage of the Class of 2018 unemployed, pursuing an additional degree, or working in a non-professional, short-term, or part-time job nine months after graduation.

Costs
The total cost of attendance (indicating the cost of tuition, fees, and living expenses) at the Law Center for the 2014-2015 academic year is $39,880.75. The Law School Transparency estimated debt-financed cost of attendance for three years is $160,966.

Notable alumni

Judges

Walter O. Bigby, state representative and appeals court judge
James E. Bolin (Class of 1937), state representative 1940-1944; Bossier-Webster district attorney 1948-1952, 26th Judicial District Court judge 1952-1960; Louisiana Second District Court of Appeal judge 1960 to 1978
Bruce M. Bolin, former state representative (1978–1990); former 26th Judicial District Court judge from 1991-2012 (D)
Henry Newton Brown, Jr., Chief Judge of the Second Circuit Court of Appeal
Roy Brun, state district court judge in Shreveport and former member of the Louisiana House of Representatives from Caddo Parish
Dewey E. Burchett, Jr. (Class of 1970), state district court judge in Bossier and Webster parishes, 1988-2008 
Paul G. Byron, United States District Court for the Middle District of Florida judge
Luther F. Cole, state representative from 1964 to 1967, state court and appeals court judge from 1967 to 1986, and Louisiana Supreme Court associate justice from 1986 to 1992
Scott Crichton (Class of 1980), judge of the Louisiana 1st Judicial District Court in Shreveport since 1991
James L. Dennis, United States Court of Appeals for the Fifth Circuit judge
Frank Burton Ellis, 1929 L.L.B., state senator and federal judge
Pike Hall, Jr. (Class of 1953, 1931-1999), Caddo Parish School Board member, appeal court judge, and associate justice of Louisiana Supreme Court 1990 to 1994; Shreveport lawyer
Douglas Gonzales, (born 1935), U.S. attorney (1972-1976) and judge of the state district court (1976-1992) and the circuit court (1993-2002) in Baton Rouge
S. Maurice Hicks, Jr., United States District Judge for the Western District of Louisiana, Shreveport Division
George W. Hardy, Jr., (1900-1967), mayor of Shreveport from 1932 to 1934 and judge of the state circuit court of appeal from 1943 to 1967
Guy Humphries, state court judge from Alexandria
Fred W. Jones, Jr., city, district, and state circuit judge from Ruston
Eddie J. Lambert, 1982 J.D. (born 1956), state representative from Ascension Parish. Mrs. Lambert is an LSU Law graduate and a judge in Ascension Parish.
Catherine D. Kimball (Class of 1970), judge of the Louisiana 18th Judicial District Court, 1982-1992; justice of the Louisiana Supreme Court, 1993-2013, former chief justice
Edgar H. Lancaster, Jr. (Class of 1948), Tallulah lawyer and member of the Louisiana House of Representatives from 1952 to 1968; interim state court judge, 1992-1993
Fred S. LeBlanc, 1920 L.L.B., mayor of Baton Rouge (1941–1944), state attorney general (1944-1948; 1952-1956), 19th Judicial District Court judge
Charles A. Marvin (Class of 1957), district attorney of Bossier and Webster parishes (1971-1975); judge of the Louisiana Circuit Court of Appeal for the Second District in Shreveport (1975-1999)
James R. Mitchell (1946-2015),   30th Judicial District Judge, Division C in Louisiana. 
Morris Lottinger, Jr. (Class of 1965), state representative (1970-1975), judge of the Louisiana First Circuit Court of Appeal (1975-1998), and chief judge (1993-1998)
Ragan Madden (Class of 1933), state representative (1940-1949) and district attorney (1949-1979) from Lincoln Parish 
W. T. McCain (Class of 1943), state representative from Grant Parish 1940 to 1948; first state district court judge only for Grant Parish (1976)
Jay McCallum (Class of 1985) - judge of the Louisiana 3rd Judicial District Court since 2003; former state representative for Lincoln and Union parishes
Eugene McGehee, member of the Louisiana House of Representatives, 1960-1972; state district court judge in East Baton Rouge Parish, 1972-1978

John Victor Parker (Class of 1952, 1928-2014), U.S. district judge for the Middle District of Louisiana (1979-2014)
G. Thomas Porteous, United States District Court judge for the Eastern District of Louisiana
O. E. Price (1924–2006, Class of 1949), municipal, district, and state appeal court judge from Bossier City
Alvin Benjamin Rubin (1920–1991), Class of 1942, federal judge from 1965 to 1991

Tom Stagg, United States District Judge in Shreveport
Lloyd George Teekell (Class of 1951), state representative from Rapides Parish from 1953 to 1960; judge of the 9th Judicial District Court from 1979 to 1990
Donald Ellsworth Walter (Class of 1964), U.S. District Judge for the United States District Court for the Western District of Louisiana, U.S. attorney for the Western District from 1969 to 1977, based in Shreveport
Ralph E. Tyson, Chief Judge, United States District Court for the Middle District of Louisiana

Roy S. Payne (Class of 1977) - Current U.S. Magistrate Judge of the U.S. District Court for the Eastern District of Texas (Marshall, Texas) (2011–Present), former U.S. Magistrate Judge of the U.S. District Court for the Western District of Louisiana (Shreveport, Louisiana) (1987-2005) 
Marcus R. Clark, Louisiana Supreme Court Justice from West Monroe
Bernette Joshua Johnson, chief justice of the Louisiana Supreme Court since 2013; associate justice, 1994-2013
Jefferson D. Hughes, III, associate justice of the Louisiana Supreme Court since 2013

Governors
Edwin Washington Edwards, 50th Governor of Louisiana, from 1972–80, 1984–88, 1992-96.
Robert F. Kennon, governor of Louisiana from 1952 to 1956.
John Bel Edwards, (Class of 1999) 56th Governor of Louisiana, 2016–present, and former State Representative.
John McKeithen, 49th Governor of Louisiana from 1964-72.
Sam H. Jones, 46th Governor of Louisiana from 1940-44.
Ruffin Pleasant, 36th Governor of Louisiana from 1916-20.

Federal Legislators

U.S. Senators
John Breaux, United States Senator from Louisiana from 1987 until 2005, lobbyist
J. Bennett Johnston, Jr., United States Senator from 1972 to 1997; former member of both houses of the Louisiana legislature from Caddo Parish; Washington, D.C.-based lobbyist
Russell B. Long, American politician who served in the United States Senate from Louisiana from 1948 to 1987

U.S. House Members
William Henson Moore, United States Representative from 1975 to 1987. Unsuccessful Republican candidate for the United States Senate; Commissioner, Panama Canal Consultative Committee, 1987–1989; Deputy Secretary of Energy, 1989–1992; White House Deputy Chief of Staff, 1992–1993; Professional Advocate.
Overton Brooks (Class of 1923), United States Representative from Louisiana's 4th congressional district from 1937 to his death in 1961.
Patrick T. Caffery (Class of 1956), United States Representative from 1969 to 1973 and member of the Louisiana House of Representatives from 1964 to 1968.
Buddy Leach, United States Representative from 1979-1981, chairman of the Louisiana Democratic Party.
Gillis W. Long, United States Representative during the 1960s.
Speedy Oteria Long, United States Representative from 1965 to 1973.
Jim McCrery, United States Representative from Louisiana's 4th congressional district (1988-2009).
Cleveland Dear, U.S. representative from 1933 to 1937, district attorney, and state judicial district court judge.
Wilbert Joseph "Billy" Tauzin, Jr., Member of the United States House of Representatives from 1980 to 2005.
Mike Johnson (Louisiana politician) (Class of 1998),  U.S. representative for Louisiana's 4th congressional district: First elected in 2016, he is also the vice chairman of the House Republican Conference. From 2015 to 2017, Johnson served as a representative in the Louisiana House of Representatives for the 8th district in Bossier Parish.

Others

Charles C. Barham (1934–2010, Class of 1959), State senator for Lincoln and Union parishes; attorney in Ruston 
Greg Barro, state senator from Caddo Parish (1992–1996); Shreveport attorney
Henry Bethard, former member of the Louisiana House from Red River Parish; former Coushatta town attorney
Carl W. Bauer, member of both houses of the Louisiana State Legislature from St. Mary Parish, 1966-1976 (D)
Allen Bradley (Class of 1976), state representative from DeRidder, 1984 to 1992, former CEO of AMERISAFE Company
Chris Broadwater (Class of 2002), current District 86 state representative from Tangipahoa Parish
Algie D. Brown, member of the Louisiana House of Representatives from Caddo Parish from 1948 to 1972; Shreveport attorney
Ossie Brown, former East Baton Rouge Parish district attorney
William Denis Brown, III (1931-2012), lawyer, businessman, state senator from Monroe 
Theo Cangelosi (Class of 1934), lawyer, businessman, politician, gubernatorial confidante
Robby Carter, state representative from Greensburg, Louisiana, 1996-2008 and since 2016
James Carville, American political consultant, commentator and pundit
Joe T. Cawthorn (Class of 1932), lawyer, businessman, and politician affiliated with the Long faction, state senator from DeSoto and Caddo parishes from 1940 to 1944
Jackson B. Davis (Class of 1940), state senator from Caddo Parish, 1952-1980; long-term Shreveport attorney
C. H. "Sammy" Downs (Class of 1946), state senator and gubernatorial advisor
James Crawford "Jam" Downs, district attorney of 9th Judicial District Court in Rapides Parish from 2000 until his retirement in 2015
Gil Dozier, Louisiana Commissioner of Agriculture and Forestry from 1976 to 1980; convicted felon, disbarred and readmitted to the bar
Francis Dugas, state representative from Lafourche Parish from 1956 to 1960; Robert F. Kennon's running-mate for lieutenant governor in 1963
Ken Duncan, state treasurer from 1996 to 2000; Baton Rouge lawyer and businessman
James R. Eubank, 1958 Law, attorney in Alexandria; member of the Louisiana House of Representatives for Rapides Parish in 1952, floor leader for Governor Robert F. Kennon, died in office at the age of thirty-seven
Ron Faucheux, former member of the Louisiana House of Representatives for Orleans Parish; political consultant and pundit from New Orleans
Jimmy Field, 1966 Law, member of the Louisiana Public Service Commission from Baton Rouge
C.B. Forgotston, 1970 J.D., political activist and state government watchdog
Mike Futrell, 1985 J.D., former state representative and East Baton Rouge Parish Metro Council member
Gerald J. Gallinghouse, 1948 J.D., former U.S. Attorney for the United States District Court for the Eastern District of Louisiana 
 Ryan Gatti, state senator for District 36 since 2016; Bossier City lawyer
Allen C. Gremillion, (1929–1971), state representative from Crowley, 1964-1971
Jack P. F. Gremillion, Attorney General of Louisiana from 1956-1972
Rufus D. Hayes, (1913–2001), first state insurance commissioner, former East Baton Rouge Parish district attorney, former state Democratic chairman
George B. Holstead (1924–2002), State representative from Lincoln Parish from 1964–1980
Thomas H. Hudson (born 1946), Baton Rouge attorney and state senator from 1976 to 1988
John Brennan Hussey (Class of 1958), Mayor of Shreveport, 1982-1990, lawyer in Shreveport
H. Alston Johnson, III, former federal judicial nominee to the U.S. Court of Appeals for the Fifth Circuit
Mike Johnson (JD), Republican member of the U.S. House of Representatives from Louisiana's 4th district. Former Member of the Louisiana House of Representatives for Bossier Parish; constitutional attorney in Benton
J. Lomax "Max" Jordan, Jr., Louisiana State Senator from Lafayette and Acadia parishes, 1992–2000
Joe LeSage, (Class of 1952), Shreveport attorney, state senator (1968–1972), LSU supervisor (1956–1968; 1992, 1998), 1948 LSU quarterback 
Nicholas Lorusso (Class of 1992), state representative from Orleans Parish since 2007 
Charles McConnell, mayor of Springhill in Webster Parish, 1954-1958
DeWitt T. Methvin, Jr. (Class of 1950), prominent Alexandria attorney from 1950 until his death in 2005
Gregory A. Miller (Class of 1988), member of the Louisiana House of Representatives from St. Charles Parish 
John Willard "Jack" Montgomery, Minden attorney and state senator from 1968–1972 
Jay Morris (Class of 1983), Louisiana state representative since 2012 from Ouachita and Morehouse parishes 
L.D. "Buddy" Napper, state representative from Lincoln Parish from 1952 to 1964
Sydney B. Nelson, state senator (1980–1992) from Caddo Parish
James E. Paxton (Class of 1988), district attorney of Louisiana 6th Judicial District (East Carroll, Madison, and Tensas parishes) 
Mike Powell (Class of 1992), former member of the Louisiana House of Representatives for Caddo and Bossier parishes and former member of the Caddo Parish School Board; Shreveport attorney
Randy Roach (born 1951, Class of 1976), lawyer, former state legislator, and mayor of his native Lake Charles since 2000
Mike Schofield (born 1969), member of the Texas House of Representatives from Harris County since 2015
Alan Seabaugh (born 1967), Class of 1993, state representative from Shreveport
Andrew L. Sevier (1894–1962, Class of 1921), state senator from Tallulah
Henry Clay Sevier, state representative from Madison Parish, 1936 to 1952 
Rob Shadoin (Class of 1975), attorney in Ruston and member of the Louisiana House of Representatives for Lincoln and Union parishes
J. Minos Simon (Class of 1946), attorney and legal author in Lafayette, Louisiana
Frank P. Simoneaux, attorney in Baton Rouge and member of the Louisiana House of Representatives from 1972 to 1982
Ed Tarpley (Class of 1979), district attorney for Grant Parish from 1991 to 1997
Risley C. Triche, Louisiana state representative, 1955–1976
R.B. Walden, director of the Louisiana Department of Hospitals and former mayor of Winnsboro
Edwin O. Ware, III (Class of 1951), District attorney for Rapides Parish, 1967-1984 
W. Scott Wilkinson, Shreveport attorney and member of the Louisiana House of Representatives from 1920-1924 (D)
J. Robert Wooley (Class of 1977), Louisiana Commissioner Insurance from 2000 to 2006; attorney with Adams & Reese in Baton Rouge (D)
Sara Blackwell (Class of 2002), employment rights advocate and media representation

See also
 Joseph T. Bockrath
 Tom Galligan
 Louisiana State University, Baton Rouge

References

Further reading 
 W. Lee Hargrave. LSU Law: The Louisiana State University Law School from 1906 to 1977. Louisiana State University Press, 2004.

External links
 

Educational institutions established in 1906
Louisiana State University
Universities and colleges accredited by the Southern Association of Colleges and Schools
Louisiana State University System
Universities and colleges in Baton Rouge, Louisiana
1906 establishments in Louisiana